Pacific Park is a mixed-use commercial and residential development project by Forest City Ratner that will consist of 17 high-rise buildings, under construction in Prospect Heights, adjacent to Downtown Brooklyn, Park Slope, and Fort Greene in Brooklyn, New York City. The project overlaps part of the Atlantic Terminal Urban Renewal Area, but also extends toward the adjacent brownstone neighborhood. Of the  project,  is located over a Long Island Rail Road train yard. A major component of the project is the Barclays Center sports arena, which opened on September 21, 2012. Formerly named Atlantic Yards, the project was renamed by the developer in August 2014 as part of a rebranding.

The development of Pacific Park is overseen by the Empire State Development Corporation. , four of fifteen planned buildings had opened, but the deadline was delayed by about 10 years from 2025 to 2035. The residential component includes the world's tallest modular apartment building, 461 Dean, opened in November 2016.

History

Context
Since the mid-20th century, there have been many proposals to develop the area around Flatbush and Atlantic Avenues, known as Times Plaza; however, plans for the area emerged only piecemeal. In the mid-1950s, Brooklyn Dodgers owner Walter O'Malley proposed that the city condemn the site, where he could then have built a new stadium for the ball club to replace Ebbets Field. City officials refused to condemn the property for subsequent sale to O'Malley on the grounds that they did not consider a privately financed baseball park to be an appropriate public purpose as defined under Title I of the Federal housing act of 1949. O'Malley's proposal was dismissed by Robert Moses for creating a Great Wall of traffic. In 1958, O'Malley relocated the Dodgers to Los Angeles. In 1968, Long Island University eyed the site, but was opposed by Mayor John V. Lindsay.

A 1968 New York Times article described a $250 million (over $1.4 billion in March 2006 dollars) plan for the Atlantic Terminal Urban Renewal Area, also known as ATURA. According to the Times, the renewal plan "calls for 2,400 new low- and middle-income housing units to replace 800 dilapidated units, removal of the blighting Fort Greene Meat Market, a  site for the City University's new Baruch College, two new parks, and community facilities such as day-care centers."

The 1970s also saw plans for ambitious projects in the area, and these mostly resulted in the construction of affordable housing on the north side of Atlantic Avenue. Baruch College also considered moving but was stymied by the City's fiscal crisis. The seeds of gentrification were planted with the establishment of the Fort Greene Historic District in 1978.

In the 1980s, a Fort Greene block association and other homeowners sued over an environmental impact statement that failed to consider how rerouted traffic would affect their neighborhood, one block away from the project. Then an economic downturn compounded community opposition. The Times reported that the stock market collapse had deterred office construction. "A lot of people are reassessing their expansion plans," James Stuckey, president of the city's Public Development Corporation, told the Times in 1988.

Development

The current project's name, devised by developer Forest City Ratner, relates to the rail yard located between Atlantic Avenue and Pacific Street. Officially, the Long Island Rail Road yard is called the "Vanderbilt Yard" by the Metropolitan Transportation Authority (named for Vanderbilt Avenue that crosses over on its way to the Brooklyn Navy Yard). The LIRR's nearby Atlantic Terminal station is the westernmost stop of the Atlantic Branch. Easy access by rapid transit and suburban rail, and the desirable brownstone housing stock nearby made it a target for speculative development.

The Pacific Park project is being developed and overseen by Forest City Ratner, an arm of Forest City Enterprises, of Cleveland, Ohio. The original master plan and some individual buildings were developed by architect Frank Gehry. Gehry was removed from the project in June 2009. After September 2009, the design for what became Barclays Center became a collaboration between Ellerbe Becket and the Manhattan architectural firm SHoP Architects. Pacific Park, overseen by the Empire State Development Corporation, is supposed to be a public-private project, Bruce Ratner told Crain's New York Business in November 2009.

In March 2008, principal developer Bruce Ratner acknowledged that the slowing economy may delay construction of both the office and residential components of the project for several years. At this point, its design included the arena being surrounded by Miss Brooklyn, a Frank Gehry-designed office building and three residential buildings in its first phase. Forest City sent a letter signed by Gehry to CEOs of many of New York's biggest corporations inviting them to be tenants. The city and state had provided $58 million of the $300 million promised in public funds for the project.

On June 23, 2008, the U.S. Supreme Court refused to hear an appeal of the federal eminent domain case. The case was refiled in state court, with slightly different arguments, and in November 2009, the project cleared what the New York Times called the "final major obstacle" when the New York Court of Appeals dismissed the final challenge to the legality of eminent domain. Further challenges to the implementation of eminent domain ensued, and were dismissed in March 2010. The most prominent member of the neighborhood opposition, Daniel Goldstein, agreed under pressure to a settlement in April 2010, allowing for vacant possession, the sale of the Nets to Mikhail Prokhorov, and the release of arena construction bonds from escrow.

The Barclays Center, for which groundbreaking for construction occurred on March 11, 2010, was opened to the public on September 21, 2012, which was also attended by some 200 protesters. It held its first event with a Jay-Z concert on September 28, 2012.

In June 2014, Governor Andrew Cuomo announced that the Atlantic Yards complex would be completed by 2025. That August, the Atlantic Yards complex was renamed Pacific Park. In addition, plans for a new building comprising affordable units, the 298-unit, 18-story building at 535 Carlton Avenue, was unveiled, and a new  public park was also revealed.

The China-based developer Greenland Holdings, along with Forest City, started the sale of 278 condos in summer 2015. The units at 550 Vanderbilt Avenue, which cost between $550,000 and $5.5 million, will be sold by Corcoran Sunshine Marketing Group.

Most of the project's Phase 1 was complete by August 2016. The master plan features a total of 16 buildings. However, by 2018, only four of the originally planned fifteen buildings had been completed. The developers stated that it may take until 2035 until the project is completed, since the project was given that build-out date when the project was re-approved in 2009.

Elements of the project

Land use
The development is sited in Prospect Heights, a gentrifying area where the median price of a residential unit exceeded $1 million in 2019. The bulk of the  project site was a mixture of public streets, private homes and small businesses. Forest City Ratner controls much of this private property and has benefited from the state's use of eminent domain to acquire and close the streets. The land is owned by New York State, and the developer has a 99-year lease.

The Public Authorities Control Board, which effectively ended the West Side Stadium plan, approved the state financing of the Atlantic Yards plan in December 2006.

Barclays Center

The Barclays Center is the home arena of the National Basketball Association's Brooklyn Nets which was purchased by a group led by principal developer Bruce Ratner with the intention of making it and the arena the centerpiece of the whole project. This brought major league professional sports to Brooklyn for the first time since the Brooklyn Dodgers moved to Los Angeles, California after the 1957 season. The arena’s design once included an ice skating rink and a green roof. The Nets, by that time owned primarily by Russia's second richest man Mikhail Prokhorov, began playing at the Barclays Center arena in 2012. Formerly the New Jersey Nets, the Nets re-branded themselves when they moved to the Barclays Center. Prokhorov, with 80 percent ownership in the Nets at that time, he became the first Russian owner of a major U.S. professional sports franchise. The deal was necessary for Ratner, who was risking losing tax-exempt financing and the Barclays naming-rights deal if he did not break ground within three months' time. On September 18, 2019, Joseph Tsai, the executive vice chairman of the Alibaba Group, completed the acquisition of full ownership of the Brooklyn Nets and Barclays Center. With the closing of the transaction, Tsai became NBA Governor of the Nets and its affiliates.

Zoning
Ground was broken on the first residential building at Pacific Park—B2—on December 18, 2012. The building will have 363 units, 50% of those units will be "affordable." In March 2011, The New York Times revealed that Forest City Ratner was considering building a 34-story apartment building out of prefabricated units, making it the largest prefabricated structure in the world. The move is likely to save considerable building costs, because construction in a factory is cheaper than at a field site. While satisfying affordable housing advocates, it is likely to anger construction unions, who have been major supporters of the project. At 32 storeys tall, B2 will be the tallest building in the world constructed using modular technology. The housing component of the project has been criticized for its urban density. The construction of a 34-story prefabricated building, while not the first prefab high-rise in the city, would be the largest. However, B2 will be completed in late 2015 — more than ten years after Atlantic Yard's commencement — instead of 2014, the original expected completion date. It was only 13% complete .

One or two buildings in the Pacific Park project would be used for office space, though  the office market is poor. Retail space would be built at the ground level of buildings.

Transportation

The project is sited above the Vanderbilt train yards belonging to the adjacent Atlantic Terminal station, after which the Atlantic Yards development was first named; this is the westernmost stop on the Long Island Rail Road (LIRR)'s Atlantic Branch. It is the primary terminal for the Far Rockaway, Hempstead, and, on weekdays, West Hempstead Branches. The location is also served by a number of bus lines.

The development sits near the intersection of Atlantic Avenue and Flatbush Avenue, one of the biggest, and the most congested, intersections in Brooklyn. The increase of car traffic to the area caused by extra housing and the construction of an arena has been frequently cited by critics as a major reason for their opposition to the project. According to the Environmental Impact Statement, the addition of more than 15,000 new residents would not significantly impact vehicular traffic, a claim contested by the Council of Brooklyn Neighborhoods. While traffic was a concern to some it has been noted that there has not been an increase in traffic associated with the arena opening while there has been a large increase in subway and Long Island Railroad use.

The project features a new $76 million subway entrance near the front of Barclays Center. The Lafayette Avenue and Fulton Street subway stations are also nearby.

Public opinion

The Community Benefits Agreement 
The edition of October 22, 2005 of The Brooklyn Paper revealed that the Forest City Ratner (FCR) company had paid large sums of money to organizations, offering what they've presented as grassroots neighborhood support for the proposed Pacific Park development. Back on December 20, 2004, six months before the so-called "community benefits agreement" (CBA) was drafted, a non-governmental pact between the developer and community groups, the 501(c)(3) filings of Brooklyn United for Innovative Local Development (BUILD) stated it would receive $5 million from Bruce Ratner's company in exchange for support. BUILD president James Caldwell was paid $125,000 a year, and two other BUILD executives— Mary Louis and Shalawn Langhorne— received $100,000 a year, according to the IRS document. Additionally, the development company has also paid $50,000 to Reverend Herbert Daughtry, another CBA endorser. His organization, Downtown Brooklyn Neighborhood Alliance, was commissioned to help create an inter-generational center as part of the Ratner plan to "retain staff to begin to develop a program to create these facilities." The political arm of BUILD, Community Leadership for Accountable Politics (CLAP), is apparently folding.

A Community Benefit Agreement, that claimed to be modeled on the first of its kind for the Staples Center in Los Angeles, was signed on June 27, 2005 between Forest City Ratner and a consortium of community groups to provide a range of benefits for the community. Many of these community groups were led by long standing and prominent leaders including Bertha Lewis, Executive Director of ACORN, James Caldwell, ED for Brooklyn United for Innovative Local Development and Rev. Herbert Daughtry, pastor of House of the Lord Church. One of the controversies surrounding the CBA is the definition of "community", and many local groups contend that they will not be included. Among the benefits accruing to the community as defined under this legally binding agreement are:
Affordable housing (for households earning up to $109,000 a year – 50% set aside with various degrees of affordability as set out in the agreement),
35% minority, and 10% women contractors hired during construction
Senior housing (10% set aside of all rental units)
Health care center within the project
Six acres of open space for use by the public free of charge on the project site

 of open space for a project of this size is considered inadequate by city standards. Opponents note that this is not the same as public space, rather it is private space open to the public at the owner's discretion. The developer will get this space after current publicly owned streetscapes are privatized.

Signatories to this agreement are All-Faith Council of Brooklyn, Association of Community Organizations for Reform Now (ACORN), Brooklyn United for Innovative Local Development (BUILD), Downtown Brooklyn Neighborhood Alliance (DBNA), Downtown Brooklyn Educational Consortium (DBEC), First Atlantic Terminal Housing Committee (FATHC), New York State Association of Minority Contractors (NYSAMC), Public Housing Communities (PHC).  Copies of the full CBA are available at the offices of each of these organizations.

While the Staples Center CBA included hundreds of community groups—many who did not originally support the project—the Atlantic Yards CBA signatories all supported the project before signing on. One group, BUILD, has been shown to have repeatedly lied about the funding it received from the developer.

The known amount of total payments to CBA signatories from the developer is $538,000.

Controversy

In a Huffington Post blog, Daniel Goldstein called Pacific Park, then named Atlantic Yards, "a corrupt land grab," "a taxpayer ripoff", "a bait and switch of epic proportions", and "a complete failure of democracy." Goldstein, who co-founded Develop Don't Destroy Brooklyn and was the last remaining homeowner (the condominium apartment he owned is where the arena's center court is now located) had his home taken by eminent domain by New York State on March 1, 2010 after nearly 8 years of court battles. At that time the state took sole ownership of his home and moved to evict him, his wife and toddler daughter. At his eviction hearing on April 21, 2010 Brooklyn judge Abraham Gerges forced the Empire State Development Corporation and Mr. Goldstein to settle on an imminent eviction date (May 7) and the constitutionally required just compensation for the home they had seized. The compensation was for $3 million, $760,000 of which went to Mr. Goldstein's attorney Mike Rikon.

FCR eventually boosted its bid to $100 million, and said the overall value of its bid was higher than the appraised value, which was validated by the courts.

Forest City Ratner offered the condo owners in 636 Pacific St. $850/sq. foot, the condo owners at 24 Sixth Ave (Spalding Buildings) $650/sq. foot and undisclosed amounts to renters. Sellers of condos signed a nondisclosure agreement, termed a "gag order" by opponents.

Further opposition
The most vocal opposition group was a nonprofit named Develop Don't Destroy Brooklyn, though other organizations are opposed to or seek to scale back the project. These organizations include: 100 Blacks in Law Enforcement, Boerum Hill Association (BHA), Central Brooklyn Independent Democrats (CBID), Committee For Environmentally Sound Development, Creative Industries Coalition (80 local businesses, galleries and collectives), Democracy for New York City (DFNYC). Other neighborhood organizations that are critical of the project are gathered under the banner of 'BrooklynSpeaks', which initially eschewed a litigation strategy but in 2009 finally went to court, in a case combined with one filed by Develop Don't Destroy Brooklyn charging that the Empire State Development Corporation (ESDC) failed to consider the impact of an additional fifteen years of construction on the surrounding neighborhood when it approved a renegotiated project plan in September 2009. In November 2010, New York State Supreme Court Judge Marcy Friedman ruled in favor of the petitioners, ordering the ESDC to either provide a justification for its continued use of the original ten-year construction schedule, or otherwise conduct a supplemental environmental impact study. BrooklynSpeaks and DDDB subsequently sought a stay of construction in advance of ESDC's response to the Court order.

In addition to these and a variety of well-established community groups in the area, the development has been opposed by now-New York Attorney General Letitia James, formerly the New York City Council member for the district. Critics point to the lack of transparency of the project, the lack of democratic review of the process, mixed successes of Ratner's previous projects, the use of eminent domain to remove residents for a commercial interest. Under the project, 68 residential or business properties were to be seized and razed; it would also cause increased traffic congestion, light pollution, gentrification, and crowding.

Cory Booker, then mayor of Newark, campaigned for the New Jersey Nets to abandon plans to play at Pacific Park, and instead relocate permanently to the Prudential Center in downtown Newark, already home to the New Jersey Devils and Seton Hall Pirates; however, he later embraced the team's interim move to Newark, from fall 2010 to 2012.

On February 14, 2006, New York State Supreme Court Justice Carol Edmead ruled in favor of the dismissal of attorney David Paget as the ESDC's outside counsel. Paget, who has been advising the ESDC in its environmental review of the Atlantic Yards project, had previously also worked for FCR companies until October 2005. Justice Edmead concluded that the appointment of Paget to the ESDC represented a conflict of interest, calling it "a severe, crippling appearance of impropriety." Furthermore, Justice Edmead gave the ESDC 45 days to find a new attorney to meet the standard of "objective public interest." On May 30, 2006, the Appellate Division, First Department, reversed Justice Edmead's the decision. "The motion court misapprehended material facts and misapplied the applicable law in granting the petition to the extent of disqualifying Paget and his law firm from representing ESDC," Justice Milton Williams wrote for a unanimous panel.

The 2007 documentary film Brooklyn Matters was one of several which took a critical look at the development project

Environmental impact
An issue concerning wastewater management was brought up during a preliminary environmental impact assessment of the project, catching the attention of Carroll Gardens residents. According to The Brooklyn Paper, the sewage generated by the development would flow into the city's antiquated combined sewer, which overloads during large rain storms. Allegedly  of untreated sewage would drain into waterways around the city each year, including 13 outfalls on the Gowanus Canal.

Lawsuit by community groups
In late October 2006 the above-mentioned community groups filed a lawsuit in federal court against Bloomberg, Governor George Pataki, and Ratner of Forest City Ratner to stop the project. The plaintiffs are charging that the project would not serve public use, and that this is required by legal precedent. The suit, Goldstein v. Pataki, is being led by Matthew Brinkerhoff.

The lawsuit was prompted by an open letter to the Village Voice, which appeared on the nolandgrab.org website. This letter stated that Justice Kennedy's Kelo concurring opinion could be used to attack eminent domain as a violation of minimum scrutiny, which says that government policy (including an eminent domain use) must be rationally related to a legitimate government purpose.

Support
The project was endorsed by the MTA and former Mayor Michael Bloomberg, has been strongly supported by former Brooklyn Borough President Marty Markowitz, who sees this project as the opportunity to finally produce the business district in Downtown Brooklyn that was intended with the construction of the Williamsburgh Savings Bank Tower but was halted by the Great Depression. The project has also been endorsed by three former governors during its pendency since 2003 (George Pataki, Eliot Spitzer, and David Paterson), who control the state agencies—Empire State Development Corporation (ESDC) and Metropolitan Transportation Authority—that are key to the project. The most fervent public support had come from Markowitz, who saw the project as the opportunity to bring professional sports back to Brooklyn. U.S. Senator Charles Schumer, Congressman Gregory W. Meeks, former Congressmen Edolphus Towns and Anthony Weiner, former State Senator Carl Kruger, and former Comptroller William C. Thompson, Jr. have also supported the project.

Job development in the boroughs outside of Manhattan was stated as part of former Mayor Bloomberg's agenda and, in this case especially, had been seen as a way to stem the tide of companies leaving New York City for New Jersey and other locations. While rents in Manhattan are prohibitive for some companies, offering lower rent office space in the boroughs was seen as a way to keep jobs in the city and maintain the tax base that sustains municipal services. Spearheaded by the then-mayor, the project has received the approval of the Empire State Development Corporation.

At least 30% of the project's units are reserved for low-, moderate- or middle-income tenants, so some people advocating affordable housing also supported the project. One of the more prominent members of this group was ACORN, which signed the Affordable Housing Memorandum of Understanding with Forest City Ratner in 2005.

Construction workers have been another group of strong supporters for the project. Anchor of Fox's Good Day New York, Rosanna Scotto, a native of the Dyker Heights section of Brooklyn, is also a supporter.

See also
Atlantic Terminal Mall
Forest City Enterprises
Hudson Yards (development), a redevelopment project in Manhattan also over a LIRR yard
MetroTech Center

References

External links

 Pacific Park website
 

Commentary websites:
  The New York Timess topic page
 Atlantic Yards Report a watchdog site, written by journalist Norman Oder
 The New York Observers coverage
 New York Daily News coverage
 The local weekly Brooklyn Papers coverage

Brooklyn Nets
Downtown Brooklyn
Economy of New York City
Empire State Development Corporation
Forest City Realty Trust
Fort Greene, Brooklyn
Long Island Rail Road
Neighborhoods in Brooklyn
Prospect Heights, Brooklyn
Basketball in New York City
Urban planning in New York City
Buildings and structures under construction in the United States
Residential buildings in Brooklyn
Multi-building developments in New York City